Clem Captein (born 29 September 1957) is a New Zealand Commonwealth Games silver medalist.

Biography
He was born in Palmerston North, New Zealand to Dutch parents.

Captein won a silver medal in track cycling at the 1982 Commonwealth Games in the 4000m team pursuit.

After retiring from competitive cycling he became a successful farmer in the Waikato region, winning sharemilker of the year in 1990/1991.

See also
New Zealand at the 1982 Commonwealth Games

References

External links
 Linkedin Profile
Industry Awards

1957 births
New Zealand male cyclists
Commonwealth Games silver medallists for New Zealand
Living people
Commonwealth Games medallists in cycling
Cyclists at the 1982 Commonwealth Games
Medallists at the 1982 Commonwealth Games